Clube Desportivo de Estarreja is a Portuguese club founded in 1944 and located in Estarreja.

History
The club was founded in November 11 of 1944. The club the most number of presences in the District Championship of Aveiro. However, has already competed in the third-level of Portuguese football.

References

Football clubs in Portugal